Malak Selim (born 1 May 2003) is an Egyptian rhythmic gymnast and a member of the Egyptian Gymnastics Federation. She represented Egypt at the 2020 Summer Olympics.

Career 
In 2016, Selim participated at the 13th African Rhythmic Gymnastics Championships which held in Walvis Bay, Namibia, ended in 1st place winning 3 gold medals in the 5-hoop events, the 5-ball events and in the 5-hoop + 5-ball event.

In 2017, Selim was a member of the silver-winning Egyptian national junior rhythmic gymnastics team who represented Egypt in the International Rhythmic Gymnastics Tournament held in Luxembourg and ended in 2nd place winning the silver medal.

In 2020, she participated in the group events at the 15th African Rhythmic Gymnastics Championships which held in Sharm El Sheikh, Egypt, ended in 1st place and won 3 gold medals in the all-around events, 5 balls events and 3 hoops + 2 clubs event which qualified the Egyptian Gymnastics team for the 2021 Olympics.

She was selected to represent Egypt at the 2020 Summer Olympics alongside Login Elsasyed, Polina Fouda, Salma Saleh, and Tia Sobhy. They finished thirteenth in the qualification round for the group all-around.

References 

Living people
2003 births
Egyptian rhythmic gymnasts
Sportspeople from Giza
Gymnasts at the 2020 Summer Olympics
Olympic gymnasts of Egypt